Deadwater is a small village in the East Hampshire district of Hampshire, England. It also borders the neighbouring village of Hollywater. The nearest railway station is Liphook, 4.1 miles (6.3 km) southeast of the village.

External links
Lindford Parish Council

Villages in Hampshire